Thebes is a village in and the former county seat of Alexander County, Illinois, United States. The population was 208 at the 2020 census, down from 436 at the 2010 census. It is part of the Cape Girardeau–Jackson, MO-IL Metropolitan Statistical Area. In 1860 the county seat was moved to Cairo, Illinois, at the confluence of the Ohio and Mississippi rivers.

History 
Thebes was established in 1835. At first it was known as Sparhawk Landing. It was the county seat of Alexander County from 1846 until 1859.

Thebes, like the city of Cairo, also in Alexander County, is named after the Egyptian city of the same name. This part of southern Illinois is known as Little Egypt.

Abraham Lincoln practiced law here. Legend holds that Dred Scott, a slave whose freedom suit reached the Supreme Court, may have been imprisoned in the local courthouse jail for a time while his case was heard. He had claimed freedom after being held in a free state but, setting aside decades of precedent, the US Supreme Court held that African Americans had no rights under the constitution, and slaves had no standing to sue for freedom (see Dred Scott v. Sanford).

As the Mississippi River at Thebes is more than four feet deep, the town became a busy steamboat port. Union troops passed through Thebes on their way to attack the South during the American Civil War. Thebes was the site of the lynching of William Johnson on April 26, 1903. Thebes Bridge, an important railroad bridge, opened for rail traffic in 1905 and is still in use today.

In 1923, Thebes elected a woman Nora Gammon to the mayorship and an all-woman slate of alderman, running on a law enforcement platform.

In literature, Thebes is the home village of Captain Andy Hawks, his wife Parthenia Ann Hawks, and daughter Magnolia in the Edna Ferber novel Show Boat (1926).

Geography
Thebes is located at  (37.219177, −89.456915).

Demographics

2020 census
Note: the US Census treats Hispanic/Latino as an ethnic category. This table excludes Latinos from the racial categories and assigns them to a separate category. Hispanics/Latinos can be of any race.

As of the 2020 census there were 208 people, 136 households, and 107 families residing in the village. The racial makeup of the village was 88.94% White, 3.37% African American, 0.00% Native American, 0.00% Asian, 0.00% Pacific Islander, 0.96% from other races, and 6.73% from two or more races. Hispanic or Latino of any race were 6.25% of the population.

There were 136 households, out of which 138.97% had children under the age of 18 living with them, 53.68% were married couples living together, 21.32% had a female householder with no husband present, and 21.32% were non-families. 15.44% of all households were made up of individuals, and 6.62% had someone living alone who was 65 years of age or older. The average household size was 4.77 and the average family size was 4.04.

The village's age distribution consisted of 47.6% under the age of 18, 4.9% from 18 to 24, 23.6% from 25 to 44, 16.9% from 45 to 64, and 6.9% who were 65 years of age or older. The median age was 20.6 years. For every 100 females, there were 67.2 males. For every 100 females age 18 and over, there were 54.0 males.

The median income for a household in the village was $38,929, and the median income for a family was $43,750. Males had a median income of $30,417 versus $21,429 for females. The per capita income for the village was $12,080. About 31.8% of families and 33.8% of the population were below the poverty line, including 46.6% of those under age 18 and 13.2% of those age 65 or over.

Education
Residents are zoned to the Egyptian School District.

References

External links
 Thebes Historical Courthouse
 Information on Thebes Courthouse at the Library of Congress

Villages in Alexander County, Illinois
Villages in Illinois
Cape Girardeau–Jackson metropolitan area
Illinois populated places on the Mississippi River
1835 establishments in Illinois